The Hong Kong Museum of Education (HKME) is a museum in Tai Po, New Territories, Hong Kong. The museum focuses on the history and development of education in the territory. The museum is located within the campus of the Education University of Hong Kong.

Exhibitions
The museum displays artifacts and material related to education and its history, which includes booklets, bulletins, certificates, photos, teaching tools, etc.

History
The museum was established on 15 May 2009.

Transportation
The museum is accessible by bus from Tai Po Market station of MTR.

See also
 List of museums in Hong Kong

References

External links

 

2009 establishments in Hong Kong
Museums established in 2009
Museums in Hong Kong